LY-2459989 is a silent antagonist of the κ-opioid receptor (KOR) that has been developed by Eli Lilly as a radiotracer of the aforementioned receptor, labeled either with carbon-11 or fluorine-18. It possesses high affinity for the KOR (Ki = 0.18 nM) and is highly selective for it over the μ-opioid receptor (Ki = 7.68 nM) and the δ-opioid receptor (Ki = 91.3 nM) (over 43-fold selectivity for the KOR over the other opioid receptors). LY-2459989 is a fluorine-containing analogue and follow-up compound of LY-2795050, the first KOR-selective antagonist radiotracer. Relative to LY-2795050, LY-2459989 displays 4-fold higher affinity for the KOR and similar selectivity and also possesses greatly improved central nervous system permeation (brain levels were found to be 6-fold higher than those of LY-2795050). The drug appears to possess a short duration of action, with only 25% remaining in serum at 30 minutes post-injection in rhesus monkeys, making it an ideal agent for application in biomedical imaging, for instance in positron emission tomography (PET).

Earlier analogues of LY-2459989 besides LY-2795050 with similar actions and potential uses have also been described.

See also
 κ-Opioid receptor § Antagonists
 List of investigational antidepressants

References

Benzamides
Kappa-opioid receptor antagonists
Fluoroarenes
3-Pyridyl compounds
Pyrrolidines
Radiopharmaceuticals
Synthetic opioids
Experimental drugs